Dynorphin A is a dynorphin, an endogenous opioid peptide that activates the κ-opioid receptor. Its amino acid sequence is Tyr-Gly-Gly-Phe-Leu-Arg-Arg-Ile-Arg-Pro-Lys-Leu-Lys.

Dynorphin A1–8 is a truncated form of dynorphin A with the amino acid sequence: Tyr-Gly-Gly-Phe-Leu-Arg-Arg-Ile. Dynorphin A1–8 is an agonist at the mu-, kappa-, and delta-opioid receptors; it has the highest binding affinity for the kappa-opioid receptor.

References 

Neuropeptides
Kappa-opioid receptor agonists
Opioid peptides